This is a list of people who have held the role of district attorney in California.

Frank M. Angellotti
Diana Becton
Isaac S. Belcher
Theodore Arlington Bell
David Berger (attorney)
Chesa Boudin
Matthew Brady (lawyer)
Robert S. Brewer Jr.
Pat Brown
Vincent Bugliosi
Joseph P. Busch
Lewis Francis Byington
John Isaiah Caldwell
Anthony Caminetti
Alfred Chapman
Maxine M. Chesney
Steve Cooley
Carol Corrigan
Christopher Cottle
John J. De Haven
Kimball H. Dimmick
John F. Dockweiler
Ezra Drown
Bonnie Dumanis
Clair Engle
John Morton Eshleman
Charles Fickert
Buron Fitts
Birgit Fladager
Edwin Alexander Forbes
Tirey L. Ford
Charles N. Fox
John D. Fredericks
Gil Garcetti
George Gascón
Jeff Gorell
Kimberly Guilfoyle
Terence Hallinan
Kamala Harris
Henry T. Hazard
Frank Hereford
Volney Howard
William Jefferson Hunsaker
Ed Jagels
Hiram Johnson
Edward J. C. Kewen
Asa Keyes
Jackie Lacey
William Langdon
James Harvey Logan
Thomas C. Lynch
Spencer M. Marsh
James McLachlan (American politician)
John Miner (attorney)
Robert F. Morrison
Arthur Ohnimus
Nancy O'Malley
Tom Orloff
Rod Pacheco
George S. Patton (attorney)
Mark Peterson (district attorney)
Robert Philibosian
Pierre-Richard Prosper
Tony Rackauckas
John E. Raker
Michael A. Ramos
Ira Reiner
Augustus Rhodes
Silas Sanderson
Aaron A. Sargent
Emmett Seawell
Gerald Shea (district attorney)
Richard M. Sims Jr.
Arlo Smith
Thomas W. Sneddon Jr.
Thomas W. Sutherland
Cameron E. Thom
William W. Upton
John Van de Kamp
Walter Van Dyke
Earl Warren
Stanley Weisberg
Tony West (attorney)
Stephen M. White
Steve White (judge)
Thomas L. Woolwine
Evelle J. Younger

References 

 Jim Raichel

District Attorneys
District Attorneys
District Attorneys
District Attorney